Karuhat Sor.Supawan is a Thai former Muay Thai fighter. He is a three time Lumpinee Stadium champion and considered one of the best fighter of the Muay Thai golden era.

Biography & career

Karuhat was introduced to muay Thai by his father and uncle, he started training along his brother at the age of 13.
For two years he fought under the name Siannoi Sitkhuno Kongnachay. He had around 30 fights mostly wins before moving to Bangkok and joining Sor.Supawan gym.

At the peak of his career Karuhat received a purse of 300,000 baht for his fight against Kaensak Sor.Ploenjit in 1993. Throughout his career Karuhat was known for his technical excellence and giving up weight against a lot of his opponents.

Titles & honours
 1990 Lumpinee Stadium 112 lbs Champion (defended once)
 1991 Lumpinee Stadium (International) 112 lbs Champion
 1993 Lumpinee Stadium 122 lbs Champion
 1995 Lumpinee Stadium 122 lbs Champion (defended once)

Fight record

|- style="background:#fbb;"
| 2002- || Loss ||align=left| Mustapha Youcef||  || France || Decision || 5 || 3:00
|- style="background:#fbb;"
| 2000-07-29 || Loss ||align=left| Alexei Pekarchyk ||  || Novosibirsk, Russia || KO (Left Hook)|| 2 || 3:00
|-
! style=background:white colspan=9 |

|- style="background:#c5d2ea;"
| 1999-03-22 || Draw ||align=left| Katsuya Kusumoto|| NJKF || Tokyo, Japan || Decision (Majority) || 5 || 3:00
|- style="background:#cfc;"
| 1995-|| Win||align=left| Boonlai Sor.Thanikul || ||  Chachoengsao, Thailand  || Decision || 5 || 3:00
|-
! style=background:white colspan=9 |
|- style="background:#cfc;"
| 1995-09-20 || Win ||align=left| Silapathai Jockygym  || Rajadamnern Stadium ||  Bangkok, Thailand  || Decision || 5 || 3:00
|- style="background:#cfc;"
| 1995-08-25 || Win ||align=left| Dokmaipa Por Pongsawang  || Lumpinee Stadium ||  Bangkok, Thailand  || Decision || 5 || 3:00
|- style="background:#cfc;"
| 1995-03-24 || Win ||align=left| Meechok Sor Ploenchit || Fairtex, Lumpinee Stadium ||  Bangkok, Thailand  || KO (Elbow) || 4 || 
|-
! style=background:white colspan=9 |
|- style="background:#cfc;"
| 1994-12-09 || Win||align=left| Nongnarong Looksamrong  || Lumpinee Stadium ||  Bangkok, Thailand  || Decision || 5 || 3:00
|- style="background:#fbb;"
| 1994-10-24 || Loss ||align=left| Samkor Kiatmontep || Rajadamnern Stadium || Bangkok, Thailand || Decision || 5 || 3:00
|- style="background:#cfc;"
| 1994-08-22 || Win||align=left| Kaensak Sor.Ploenjit || Rajadamnern Stadium ||  Bangkok, Thailand  || Decision || 5 || 3:00
|- style="background:#cfc;"
| 1994- || Win||align=left| Saengmorakot Sor.Ploenjit|| Rajadamnern Stadium ||  Bangkok, Thailand  || Decision || 5 || 3:00
|- style="background:#fbb;"
| 1994-06-06 || Loss ||align=left| Silapathai Jockygym || Rajadamnern Stadium ||  Bangkok, Thailand  || Decision || 5 || 3:00
|- style="background:#fbb;"
| 1994-04-29 || Loss ||align=left| Wangchannoi Sor Palangchai || Lumpinee Stadium ||  Bangkok, Thailand  || Decision || 5 || 3:00
|-
! style=background:white colspan=9 |
|- style="background:#cfc;"
| 1994-03-08 || Win ||align=left| Chatchai Paiseetong || Lumpinee Stadium ||  Bangkok, Thailand  || Decision || 5 || 3:00
|- style="background:#fbb;"
| 1994-01-07 || Loss ||align=left| Wangchannoi Sor Palangchai || Lumpinee Stadium ||  Bangkok, Thailand  || Decision || 5 || 3:00
|- style="background:#cfc;"
| 1993-12-17 || Win ||align=left| Chatchai Paiseetong || Lumpinee Stadium ||  Bangkok, Thailand  || Decision || 5 || 3:00
|-
! style=background:white colspan=9 |
|- style="background:#cfc;"
| 1993-11-28 || Win||align=left| Hansek Prasathinpanomrung || Lumpinee Stadium ||  Bangkok, Thailand  || Decision || 5 || 3:00
|- style="background:#fbb;"
| 1993-09-17 || Loss||align=left| Chatchai Paiseetong || Lumpinee Stadium ||  Bangkok, Thailand  || Decision || 5 || 3:00
|- style="background:#cfc;"
| 1993-08-31 || Win||align=left| Lamnamoon Sor.Sumalee || Lumpinee Stadium ||  Bangkok, Thailand  || Decision || 5 || 3:00
|- style="background:#cfc;"
| 1993-07-30 || Win||align=left| Mathee Jedeepitak || Lumpinee Stadium ||  Bangkok, Thailand  || Decision || 5 || 3:00
|- style="background:#cfc;"
| 1993-06-25 || Win||align=left| Nungubon Sitlerchai || Lumpinee Stadium ||  Bangkok, Thailand  || Decision || 5 || 3:00
|- style="background:#fbb;"
| 1993-05-07 || Loss||align=left| Boonlai Sor.Thanikul || Lumpinee Stadium ||  Bangkok, Thailand  || Decision || 5 || 3:00
|- style="background:#cfc;"
| 1993-04-06 || Win||align=left| Kaensak Sor.Ploenjit || Lumpinee Stadium ||  Bangkok, Thailand  || Decision || 5 || 3:00
|- style="background:#cfc;"
| 1993-03-16 || Win||align=left| Nungubon Sitlerchai || Lumpinee Stadium ||  Bangkok, Thailand  || Decision || 5 || 3:00
|- style="background:#cfc;"
| 1993-02-26 || Win||align=left| Jompoplek Sor.Sumalee || Lumpinee Stadium ||  Bangkok, Thailand  || Decision || 5 || 3:00
|- style="background:#fbb;"
| 1993-01-19 || Loss||align=left| Lamnamoon Sor.Sumalee || Lumpinee Stadium ||  Bangkok, Thailand  || Decision || 5 || 3:00
|- style="background:#cfc;"
| 1992-12-29 || Win||align=left| Kruekchai Kiatyongyuth || Lumpinee Stadium  ||  Bangkok, Thailand  || TKO (Doctor stoppage)|| 3 || 

|- style="background:#fbb;"
| 1992-07-27 || Loss||align=left| Nungubon Sitlerchai  || Lumpinee Stadium ||  Bangkok, Thailand  || Referee Stoppage || 5 || 
|- style="background:#cfc;"
| 1992-06-30 || Win||align=left| Michael Sor.Sukhontip || Lumpinee Stadium ||  Bangkok, Thailand  || Decision || 5 || 3:00
|- style="background:#fbb;"
| 1992-04-07 || Loss ||align=left| Duansompong Por Pongsawang  || Lumpinee Stadium ||  Bangkok, Thailand  || Decision || 5 || 3:00
|- style="background:#fbb;"
| 1992-03-10 || Loss||align=left| Wangchannoi Sor Palangchai  || Lumpinee Stadium ||  Bangkok, Thailand  || Decision || 5 || 3:00
|- style="background:#cfc;"
| 1992-02-07 || Win||align=left| Mathee Jedeepitak || Lumpinee Stadium ||  Bangkok, Thailand  || Decision || 5 || 3:00
|- style="background:#cfc;"
| 1991-12-27 || Win||align=left| Duangsmpong Por.Pongsawang || Lumpinee Stadium ||  Bangkok, Thailand  || KO  || 3 ||

|- style="background:#fbb;"
| 1991-11-26 || Loss||align=left| Langsuan Panyuthaphum || Lumpinee Stadium ||  Bangkok, Thailand  || Decision || 5 || 3:00

|- style="background:#cfc;"
| 1991-11-04 || Win ||align=left| Jaroensap Kiatbanchong || OneSongchai  ||  New Zealand  || Decision || 5 || 3:00 
|-
! style=background:white colspan=9 |

|- style="background:#cfc;"
| 1991-10-18 || Win||align=left| Nungubon Sitlerchai || Lumpinee Stadium ||  Bangkok, Thailand  || Decision || 5 || 3:00

|- style="background:#cfc;"
| 1991-09-17 || Win||align=left| Tukthathong Por.Pongsawang || Lumpinee Stadium ||  Bangkok, Thailand  || Decision || 5 || 3:00

|- style="background:#cfc;"
| 1991-08-06 || Win ||align=left| Chainoi Muangsurin || Lumpinee Stadium ||  Bangkok, Thailand  || KO || 2 ||
|- style="background:#fbb;"
| 1991-06-24 || Loss ||align=left| Veeraphol Sahaprom || Rajadamnern Stadium ||  Bangkok, Thailand  || Decision || 5 || 3:00
|- style="background:#cfc;"
| 1991-05-17 || Win ||align=left| Panomrung Sit Sor.War.Por ||  ||  Bangkok, Thailand  || Decision || 5 || 3:00

|- style="background:#cfc;"
| 1991-04-20 || Win||align=left| D-Day Kiatmuangkan || OneSongchai ||  New Zealand  || Decision || 5 || 3:00

|- style="background:#cfc;"
| 1991-03-29 || Win||align=left| Mathee Jedeepitak || Lumpinee Stadium ||  Bangkok, Thailand  || Decision || 5 || 3:00
|- style="background:#cfc;"
| 1991-03-04 || Win ||align=left| Duansompong Por Pongsawang || Lumpinee Stadium ||  Bangkok, Thailand  || KO (Right Elbow)|| 3 || 2:00
|- style="background:#fbb;"
| 1991-02-12 || Loss||align=left| Langsuan Panyuthaphum || Lumpinee Stadium ||  Bangkok, Thailand  || Decision || 5 || 3:00
|-
! style=background:white colspan=9 |
|- style="background:#fbb;"
| 1991-01-25 || Loss ||align=left| Dokmaipa Por Pongsawang || Lumpinee Stadium ||  Bangkok, Thailand  || Decision || 5 || 3:00
|- style="background:#cfc;"
| 1991-01-04 || Win ||align=left| Detduang Por.Pongsawang || Lumpinee Stadium ||  Bangkok, Thailand  || TKO (Doctor Stoppage) || 2 ||

|- style="background:#fbb;"
| 1990-11-27 || Loss||align=left| Boonlai Sor.Thanikul || Lumpinee Stadium ||  Bangkok, Thailand  || Decision || 5 || 3:00
|- style="background:#cfc;"
| 1990-10-30 || Win ||align=left| Chainoi Muangsurin || Lumpinee Stadium ||  Bangkok, Thailand  || Decision || 5 || 3:00
|- style="background:#fbb;"
| 1990-10-07 || Loss||align=left| Oley Kiatoneway || OneSongchai ||  New Zealand  || Decision || 5 || 3:00
|-
! style=background:white colspan=9 |
|- style="background:#cfc;"
| 1990-09-11|| Win ||align=left| Rainbow Sor.Prantalay|| Lumpinee Stadium ||  Bangkok, Thailand  || Decision || 5 || 3:00

|- style="background:#cfc;"
| 1990-08-15 || Win ||align=left| Samernoi Tor.Boonlert || Lumpinee Stadium ||  Bangkok, Thailand  || Decision || 5 || 3:00
|- style="background:#fbb;"
| 1990-06-29 || Loss||align=left| Chainoi Muangsurin || Lumpinee Stadium ||  Bangkok, Thailand  || KO (Left High Kick)|| 3 || 
|-
! style=background:white colspan=9 |
|-  style="background:#cfc;"
| 1990-05-15|| Win ||align=left| Namkabuan Nongkeepahuyuth || Lumpinee Stadium ||  Bangkok, Thailand  || Decision || 5 || 3:00
|- style="background:#cfc;"
| 1990-04-27 || Win||align=left| Michael Liewfat || Lumpinee Stadium ||  Bangkok, Thailand  || Decision || 5 || 3:00
|-  style="background:#cfc;"
| 1990-04-10|| Win ||align=left| Pairojnoi Sor Siamchai || Lumpinee Stadium ||  Bangkok, Thailand  || Decision || 5 || 3:00
|-
! style=background:white colspan=9 |
|- style="background:#cfc;"
| 1990-03-13 || Win ||align=left| Panphet Muangsurin || Lumpinee Stadium ||  Bangkok, Thailand  || Decision || 5 || 3:00
|-  style="background:#fbb;"
| 1990-01-19|| Loss ||align=left| Namkabuan Nongkeepahuyuth || Lumpinee Stadium ||  Bangkok, Thailand  || KO (Low Kicks) || 2 ||
|- style="background:#cfc;"
| 1989-11-28 || Win||align=left| Oley Kiateonaway || Lumpinee Stadium ||  Bangkok, Thailand  || Decision || 5 || 3:00
|- style="background:#cfc;"
| 1989-11-06 || Win ||align=left| Suntos Devy || Rajadamnern Stadium ||  Bangkok, Thailand  || Decision || 5 || 3:00
|- style="background:#cfc;"
| 1989-10-20 ||Win ||align=left| Thanooin Chor.Rachat ||  Lumpinee Stadium  || Bangkok, Thailand || Decision || 5 ||3:00
|- style="background:#cfc;"
| 1989-10-06 ||Win ||align=left| Veeraphol Sahaprom ||  Lumpinee Stadium  || Bangkok, Thailand || Decision || 5 ||3:00
|- style="background:#fbb;"
| 1989-08-29 || Loss||align=left| Boonlai Sor.Thanikul || Lumpinee Stadium ||  Bangkok, Thailand  || Decision || 5 || 3:00

|- style="background:#fbb;"
| 1989-08-15 || Loss||align=left| Phanphet Muangsurin || Lumpinee Stadium ||  Bangkok, Thailand  || Decision || 5 || 3:00

|- style="background:#fbb;"
| 1989-07-25 || Loss||align=left| Kaensak Sor.Ploenjit || Lumpinee Stadium ||  Bangkok, Thailand  || Decision || 5 || 3:00

|- style="background:#cfc;"
| 1989-05-30 || Win||align=left| Pongsiri Por Ruamrudee || Lumpinee Stadium  ||  Bangkok, Thailand  || Decision || 5 || 3:00

|- style="background:#cfc;"
| 1989-04-21 || Win ||align=left| Yodpetch Sor.Jitpattana || Lumpinee Stadium ||  Bangkok, Thailand  || Decision || 5 || 3:00
|- style="background:#fbb;"
| 1989-03-28 || Loss ||align=left| Langsuan Panyuthaphum || Lumpinee Stadium ||  Bangkok, Thailand  || Decision || 5 || 3:00
|- style="background:#cfc;"
| 1989-01-31 || Win ||align=left| Hippy Singmanee || Lumpinee Stadium ||  Bangkok, Thailand  || Decision || 5 || 3:00
|- style="background:#c5d2ea;"
| 1989-01-06 || Draw||align=left| Langsuan Panyuthaphum || Lumpinee Stadium ||  Bangkok, Thailand  || Decision || 5 || 3:00
|- style="background:#cfc;"
| 1988-11-25 || Win ||align=left| Veeraphol Sahaprom || Lumpinee Stadium ||  Bangkok, Thailand  || Decision || 5 || 3:00
|- style="background:#cfc;"
| 1988-10-28 || Win ||align=left| Paruhatlek Sitchunthong || Lumpinee Stadium ||  Bangkok, Thailand  || Decision || 5 || 3:00
|- style="background:#cfc;"
| 1988-10-11 || Win||align=left| Sekson Sitjoenthong || Lumpinee Stadium ||  Bangkok, Thailand  || Decision || 5 || 3:00
|- style="background:#fbb;"
| 1988-08-30 || Loss||align=left| Hippy Singmanee || Lumpinee Stadium ||  Bangkok, Thailand  || Decision || 5 || 3:00
|-
! style=background:white colspan=9 |
|- style="background:#cfc;"
| 1988-07-08 || Win||align=left| Seesot Sor.Ritthichai || Lumpinee Stadium ||  Bangkok, Thailand  || Decision || 5 || 3:00
|- style="background:#fbb;"
| 1988-06-24 || Loss||align=left| Hippy Singmanee || Lumpinee Stadium ||  Bangkok, Thailand  || Decision || 5 || 3:00
|- style="background:#cfc;"
| 1988-05-31 || Win ||align=left| Panphet Muangsurin || Lumpinee Stadium ||  Bangkok, Thailand  || Decision || 5 || 3:00
|- style="background:#cfc;"
| 1988-05-03 || Win ||align=left| Pairojnoi Sor Siamchai || Lumpinee Stadium ||  Bangkok, Thailand  || Decision || 5 || 3:00
|- style="background:#cfc;"
| 1988-03-15 || Win||align=left| Kaensak Sor.Ploenjit || Lumpinee Stadium ||  Bangkok, Thailand  || Decision || 5 || 3:00
|- style="background:#cfc;"
| 1988-02-02 || Win ||align=left| Morakot Sor Tamarangsri || Lumpinee Stadium ||  Bangkok, Thailand  || Decision || 5 || 3:00
|- style="background:#fbb;"
| 1987- || Loss||align=left| Hippy Singmanee || Lumpinee Stadium ||  Bangkok, Thailand  || Decision || 5 || 3:00
|-
! style=background:white colspan=9 |
|- style="background:#cfc;"
| 1987-07-31 || Win ||align=left| Pairojnoi Sor Siamchai || Lumpinee Stadium ||  Bangkok, Thailand  || Decision || 5 || 3:00

|- style="background:#cfc;"
| 1987-04-21 || Win ||align=left| Yodpetch Sor.Jitpattana|| Lumpinee Stadium ||  Bangkok, Thailand  || Decision || 5 || 3:00
|- style="background:#cfc;"
| 1986-11-25 || Win||align=left| Komkhai Kiatcharoen || Lumpinee Stadium ||  Bangkok, Thailand  || Decision || 5 || 3:00
|- style="background:#cfc;"
| 1986-09-01 || Win||align=left| Toto Por.Pongsawang || Lumpinee Stadium ||  Bangkok, Thailand  || Decision || 5 || 3:00
|- style="background:#cfc;"
| 1986- || Win||align=left| Daonoi Sakwicha || Lumpinee Stadium ||  Bangkok, Thailand  || Decision || 5 || 3:00
|- style="background:#cfc;"
| 1986- || Win||align=left| Samart Sor.Lukindia || Lumpinee Stadium ||  Bangkok, Thailand  || Decision || 5 || 3:00
|- style="background:#cfc;"
| 1986- || Win||align=left| Saengdawnoi Tor.Silachai|| Lumpinee Stadium ||  Bangkok, Thailand  || Decision || 5 || 3:00
|- style="background:#cfc;"
| 1986- || Win||align=left| Wanchai Sor.Weerakul || Lumpinee Stadium ||  Bangkok, Thailand  || Decision || 5 || 3:00
|- style="background:#cfc;"
| 1986- || Win||align=left| Rungrat Krisaenchai ||  Lumpinee Stadium ||  Bangkok, Thailand || Decision || 5 || 3:00
|- style="background:#cfc;"
| 1986- || Win||align=left| Daonoi Daonakhonpatom||  Lumpinee Stadium ||  Bangkok, Thailand || Decision || 5 || 3:00
|- style="background:#fbb;"
| 1986- || Loss ||align=left| Saengdawnoi Tor.Silachai|| Lumpinee Stadium ||  Bangkok, Thailand  || Decision || 5 || 3:00
|- style="background:#fbb;"
| 1986- || Loss ||align=left| Nuengthoranee Petchyindee || Lumpinee Stadium ||  Bangkok, Thailand  || Decision || 5 || 3:00
|- style="background:#cfc;"
| 1986- || Win ||align=left| Kornlakarn Petchyindee ||  ||  Chaopraya, Thailand  || Decision || 5 || 3:00
|- style="background:#cfc;"
| 1985- || Win ||align=left| Nuengthoranee Petchyindee ||  || Samrong, Thailand  || Decision || 5 || 3:00
|- style="background:#cfc;"
| 1985- || Win ||align=left| Jonoi Wittayakonsong||  Rajadamnern Stadium || Bangkok, Thailand  || TKO || 3 ||
|- style="background:#cfc;"
| 1985- || Win ||align=left| Payoongsak Tor.Nopparat||  || Khon Kaen, Thailand  || KO || 1 ||
|- style="background:#cfc;"
| 1985- || Win ||align=left| Dekpam Na Nongkhae|| Rajadamnern Stadium || Bangkok, Thailand  || Decision || 5 || 3:00
|- style="background:#cfc;"
| 1985- || Win ||align=left| Mongkolphet Sakchamroen|| Rajadamnern Stadium || Bangkok, Thailand  || Decision || 5 || 3:00
|- style="background:#fbb;"
| 1985- || Loss ||align=left| Saksi Yuttakrit|| Rajadamnern Stadium || Bangkok, Thailand  || Decision || 5 || 3:00
|- style="background:#cfc;"
| 1985- || Win ||align=left| Thongrap Kwanchai || Samrong Stadium || Thailand  || Decision || 5 || 3:00
|- style="background:#c5d2ea;"
| 1985- || Draw ||align=left| Panomrung Srikung||  || Chonburi province, Thailand  || Decision || 5 || 3:00
|-
| colspan=9 | Legend:

References

1968 births
Living people
Karuhat Sor.Supawan
Muay Thai trainers
Karuhat Sor.Supawan